Arvid David Hummel (1778–1836), Swedish entomologist and notary
 Arthur W. Hummel Jr. (1920–2001), U.S. diplomat, ambassador to China from 1981 to 1985
 Arthur W. Hummel Sr. (1884–1975), missionary and noted Sinologist
 Bertold Hummel (1925–2002), German composer of classical music
 Carl Hummel (1821–1907), German landscape painter, son of Johann Nepomuk Hummel
 Charles F. Hummel (born 1932), American museum curator 
 Cooper Hummel (born 1994), American baseball player
 Don Hummel (1907–1988), American businessman and politician
 Ferdinand Hummel (1855–1928), German composer and musician
 Franz Hummel (1939–2022), German composer and pianist
 Frederick P. Hummel (1856–1915), American lawyer and politician
 George Hummel (born 1976), Namibian football player
 George Hummel (business manager) (1887–1965), American business manager
 Jake Hummel (born 1999), American football player
 Jeremy Hummel (born 1974), American drummer
 Jim Hummel, American cartoonist
 Johann Erdmann Hummel (1769–1852), German painter
 Johann Nepomuk Hummel (1778–1837), Austrian composer and pianist
  Johann Wilhelm Bentz, nicknamed Hans Hummel (1787–1854), Hamburg folk-icon.
 John Hummel (1883–1959), American baseball player
 Joseph Friedrich Hummel (1841–1919), Austrian composer and musician
 Joye Hummel (1924–2021), American comic book author
 Kenny van Hummel (born 1982), Dutch road bicycle racer
 Maria Innocentia Hummel (1909–1946), German Franciscan nun, painter and designer of the Hummel figurines
 Mark Hummel (born 1955), American blues harmonica player
 Peter W. Hummel (1929–2015), American geologist and oil company president
 Ralph P. Hummel (1937–2012), American professor of public administration 
 Rand Hummel (born 1956), American preacher and author
 Reinhart Hummel (1930–2007), German theologian
 Robbie Hummel (born 1989), American basketball player
 Siegbert Hummel (1908–2001), German Tibetologist and cultural historian
 Walter Hummel (athlete) (1892–1978), American athlete
 Walter Hummel (musicologist) (1883–1968), Austrian musicologist and pedagogue

Surnames from nicknames
Surnames from given names